Enterprise High School is a public high school in Redding, California. It has an enrollment of about 1200 students. Enterprise High School is part of Shasta Union High School District in the Redding. Its main rival is Shasta High School.

Administration 

 Principal - Ryan Johnson 
 Assistant Principal - Joey Brown 
 Assistant Principal - Jill Hardy

Enterprise is one of the few schools to have had a husband and wife team as principals - Eric Peterson from 2006-2016 and Shelle Peterson from 2001-2003.

Academics 
Enterprise High School is a state-recognized distinguished school in California. The foreign languages offered are French, Spanish, and Mandarin Chinese. There is also a drama department, which lets students perform in plays and musicals. Enterprise currently offers Honors and Advanced Placement Courses in: English I, English II, English III, English IV, Biology, Physics, Chemistry, Psychology, European History, U.S. History, American Government/Economics, Statistics, Trigonometry, Calculus, and Spanish.

Due to the low socio-economic status of Enterprise, test scores are reflective of that status.  Contrary to popular belief, however, Enterprise ranks a 10 out of 10 when compared to schools of similar size.  Other schools in the district rank much lower when compared to schools of equivalent size and socio-economic status.
Enterprise also has an extensive and broad College Preparatory program. Every subject is offered in CP level, acceptable to the University of California and California State University systems.

Enterprise has an extensive list of available electives, in which they satisfy unit credit for the UC and CSU systems.

Music 
 Marching and concert bands
 "Starship", a pop-oriented music program. Starship is made up of a band (usually consisting of two keyboardists, a bassist, a guitarist, two drummers, four trumpets, three trombones, and 5 saxophonists) and  "Singer/Dancers" which, as the name suggests, sing and dance.
 Traditional choirs
 Vocal jazz choir "T.B.A."

Enterprise stages the Victorian Dinner Celebration now in its 31st year of performances.  This original dinner/play set in a Victorian Christmas holiday venue is an evening of comedy, food, and vocal and instrumental music.

Athletics
Enterprise currently requires a 2.0 GPA to participate in sports.

 Alpine Skiing/Snowboarding
 Baseball
 Basketball
 Cheerleading
 Cross country
 Football
 Golf
 Soccer
 Softball
 Stunt cheer
 Swimming
 Tennis
 Track and field
 Volleyball
 Wrestling

River Bowl 
Every October, Enterprise and their main rival, Shasta High School, play in a celebrated game called the River Bowl. The Hornets and the Wolves have been playing for the bowl for 24 years. After Enterprise winning the River Bowl every year, Shasta finally took the River Bowl in 2005. However, Enterprise won the River Bowl back on October 13, 2006 with a score of 10-0, the first shut out in River Bowl history. On October 12, 2007, a great and close game was played with the conclusion of Shasta winning the River Bowl back with a score of 17-24. The overall score of wins for the last 27 years is 17-10, with Enterprise in the lead.

Demographics 
In 2011, Enterprise High School had 1,294 Students: 1.9% African American, 10% Asian, 70.17% Caucasian, 11.44% Hispanic or Latino, 2.78% Native American, and 0.62% Pacific Islander.

Bodine v. Enterprise High School
Around 1 A.M. on March 1, 1982, 18-year-old Rick Earl Bodine and three others trespassed on the roof of Enterprise High School, allegedly to steal floodlights from the roof. After handing down one of the lights, Bodine reportedly walked across to take a second light, but in the dark and rain, he fell through a painted-over skylight; the trespassers called an ambulance. Brain damage from the 27-foot fall initially left Bodine mute and quadriplegic.

The state declined to prosecute Bodine, viewing that the injuries were more than sufficient punishment. Bodine's attorney, Al Naphan, sued the school district, arguing the district was negligent; a similar incident had occurred at the district's Shasta High School on June 6, 1981, killing Paul Andrew Schurr. Judge Joseph Redmon ruled that criminal conduct would not bar Bodine from suing or collecting. The district's insurance company settled the case for $260,000 up front plus $1,500 per month for the rest of Bodine's life.

The Bodine case was referenced by California assemblyman Alister McAlister during his campaign for AB200; while a similar bill (AB2800) had been rejected in the previous session, AB200 was signed into law on October 2, 1985. Statute 847 of the California Civil Code currently states:

A 1986 ad in support of Proposition 51, also featuring McAlister, started with the line "Attempting to steal from a school, a burglar falls through a gymnasium skylight and sues the school for his injuries."

A fictional case similar to Bodine is mentioned in the 1997 film Liar Liar; in 2012, former Arizona Senate president Russell Pearce cited the fictional lawsuit while campaigning for the Crime Victims Protection Act Amendment.

Notable alumni 
Sam Butcher (class of 1956), creator of Precious Moments drawings, figurines and dolls
Carol Clover (class of 1958), American professor of Medieval Studies (Early Northern Europe) and American Film at the University of California, Berkeley
Michael Zagaris (class of 1963), Oakland Athletics and San Francisco 49ers team photographer
Jeffery Dangl (class of 1976), biology researcher and scientist
Shane Drake (class of 1992), music video director
Ryan O'Callaghan (class of 2001), NFL football player
Lynne Roberts (class of 1993), women's basketball head coach, University of Utah
George Theobald (class of 1978), member of U.S. World Cup ski team

References

External links
Enterprise High School - Home

High schools in Shasta County, California
Public high schools in California
Redding, California
Buildings and structures in Redding, California
1954 establishments in California